Yewens v Noakes (1880) 6 QBD 530, was an English tax law case which addressed the question of the division between master and servant.

Facts
There was a statutory exemption for duty on inhabited houses where premises were occupied by 'a servant or other person.... for the protection

Judgment
The Court of Appeal held that a clerk who earned £150 a year did not fall within the definition of servant.

Lord Justice Bramwell gave judgment said, "a servant is a person who is subject to the command of his master as to the manner in which he shall do his work."

Lord Justice Thesiger said it was obvious that a salaried clerk was not a "servant" any more than were "the manager of a bank, a foreman with high wages, persons in the position almost of gentlemen."

See also

Contract of employment
UK labour law
R v Negus

Notes

References

United Kingdom labour case law
English vicarious liability case law
Baron Bramwell cases
1880 in case law
1880 in British law
Court of Appeal (England and Wales) cases
English law articles needing infoboxes